Sude Hacımustafaoğlu (born March 25, 2002 in İzmir, Turkey) is a Turkish female volleyball player. She plays for Galatasaray.

Youth career
She played at Gelişim College in the 2018-19 season. Drawing attention with his good game, Sude was transferred to Galatasaray youth team in August 2019.

Club career
She was included in the Galatasaray A Team squad in the 2020-21 season.

References

External links
Player profile at Galatasaray.org
Player profile at Volleybox.net
Player profile at Worldofvolley.com
Player profile at Nomos LLC – Sport Business

2002 births
Living people
Turkish women's volleyball players
Galatasaray S.K. (women's volleyball) players
21st-century Turkish sportswomen